The Caelidracones is a group of pterosaurs.

The clade Caelidracones was defined in 2003 by David Unwin as the group consisting of the last common ancestor of Anurognathus ammoni  and Quetzalcoatlus northropi, and all its descendants.

The name Caelidracones means "sky dragons" from Latin caelum, "heaven", and draco, "dragon" and is a reference to Harry Govier Seeley's 1901 book, Dragons of the Air.

Classification
In Unwin's original classification, the Caelidracones were considered the sister group of the Dimorphodontidae within the Macronychoptera and consist of the Anurognathidae and the Lonchognatha. More recent studies of pterosaur relationships have found anurognathids and pterodactyloids to be sister groups, which would limit Caelidracones to just those two clades.

Below is a cladogram showing the results of a phylogenetic analysis presented by Longrich, Martill, and Andres, 2018. This study found the two traditional groupings of ctenochasmatoids and kin as an early branching group, with all other pterodactyloids grouped into the Eupterodactyloidea.

References

Monofenestratans
Oxfordian first appearances
Maastrichtian extinctions